Meergunj or Meerganj was a red-light area in Allahabad, Uttar Pradesh. famous for flesh-trade back in 2016. Apart from local sex workers, many were trafficked from the Indian states of West Bengal, Bihar, Jharkhand, Madhya Pradesh and the neighbouring countries of Nepal and Bangladesh.

The area was known for sex trafficking, involvement of gangsters and violence.

In 2016, social worker Sunil Chowdhaty filed a petition in the Allahabad High Court to have the red-light district closed and the trade moved to the city outskirts. The Court ruled in favor of the petition. However some sex workers returned to the area.

See also
 
 Prostitution in India
 Prostitution in Asia 
 Prostitution in Kolkata 
 Prostitution in Mumbai 
 All Bengal Women's Union
 Durbar Mahila Samanwaya Committee 
 Sonagachi 
 Male prostitution

References 
 

Prostitution in India 
Neighbourhoods in Allahabad
Red-light districts in India